Sigleß (until 1937, Siegleß;) is a town in the district of Mattersburg in the Austrian state of Burgenland.

Population

References

Cities and towns in Mattersburg District